Robert Arthur Lloyd (March 1868 – 10 January 1942) was a Welsh footballer who played as a full back. He played twice for his country, in 1891 and 1895. He later became a priest in the Church of England.

Life and career
The son of a schoolteacher, Lloyd was born in March 1868 in Ystalyfera, Glamorgan. When he was five, the family moved to Ruthin, Denbighshire. Lloyd attended Ruthin Grammar School, where he later taught. 

He was an athletic schoolboy, excelling in the high jump, and his speed earned him a place on the left wing in the school football team; only later did he settle in the full-back position. He played for amateur touring teams and for Rhyl, and it was while a Rhyl player that he was selected as reserve for Wales' match against Ireland in Belfast in February 1891. When Seth Powell withdrew, Lloyd took his place at left back in a match that ended as a 7–2 win for the hosts. He played once more for Wales, in March 1895by which time he was a Ruthin playerin a 2–2 draw with Scotland.

Lloyd married Helen Speakman in 1900. He studied for the priesthood at Trinity College Dublin, and in 1909 was ordained as a deacon and licensed to the curacy of St Matthew, Bootle. His last clerical post was as rector of Hughley, Shropshire, after which he lived in retirement first in Gloucester and then in Tickenham, Somerset, where he died in January 1942.

Notes

References

1868 births
1942 deaths
Sportspeople from Neath Port Talbot
Welsh footballers
Wales international footballers
Association football fullbacks
Rhyl F.C. players
Alumni of Trinity College Dublin
20th-century Church of England clergy
Ruthin Town F.C. players